Angela Gehann-Dernbach (born February 21, 1958, in Bucharest, Romania) is a German conductor, organist and singer based in Darmstadt, Germany.

Gehann-Dehrbach has chaired both the Internationale Gesellschaft für Deutsche Romantik (the International Society for German Romanticism) and the Baussnern Society, an organization dedicated to the music of composer Waldemar von Baußnern (1866–1931).  She has won prizes in international choral competitions and led choir tours of 12 European countries and the United States.

At present she conducts both the chamber choir of Marienhöhe Darmstadt and the vocal ensemble Cantabile Darmstadt; since 2006, both the Bach-Chor Darmstadt and Kammerorchester Pro Musica have been under her musical direction.

External links 
  Baussnern Society

German organists
Musicians from Darmstadt
1958 births
Living people
Women conductors (music)
20th-century German conductors (music)
20th-century organists
21st-century German conductors (music)
21st-century organists
Women organists
20th-century women musicians
21st-century women musicians